Campiglossa suboculata is a species of fruit fly in the family Tephritidae.

Distribution
The species is found in Ethiopia.

References

Tephritinae
Insects described in 1939
Diptera of Africa